Ahmadabad (also Romanized as Aḩmadābād) is a village in Sardaran Rural District, in the Central District of Kabudarahang County, Hamadan Province, Iran. At the 2006 census, its population was 610, in 124 families.

References 

Populated places in Kabudarahang County